Sergei Aleksandrovich Chibisov (born 1 March 2000) is a Russian football player.

Club career
He started his senior career on loan in the fourth-tier Finnish club FC Åland.

He made his debut in the Russian Premier League for FC Zenit Saint Petersburg on 16 May 2021 in a game against FC Tambov. He substituted Daler Kuzyayev in the 78th minute.

On 29 June 2021, he signed a 2-year contract with an extension option with FC Yenisey Krasnoyarsk.

Honours

Club
Zenit Saint Petersburg
Russian Premier League: 2020–21

References

External links
 
 

2000 births
Living people
Russian footballers
Association football defenders
FC Åland players
FC Zenit-2 Saint Petersburg players
FC Zenit Saint Petersburg players
FC Yenisey Krasnoyarsk players
Kolmonen players
Russian Premier League players
Russian First League players
Russian Second League players
Russian expatriate footballers
Expatriate footballers in Finland
Russian expatriate sportspeople in Finland